Marcin Komenda (born 24 May 1996) is a Polish professional volleyball player. He is a member of the Poland national team. At the professional club level, he plays for LUK Lublin.

References

External links
 
 Player profile at PlusLiga.pl 
 Player profile at Volleybox.net

1996 births
Living people
Sportspeople from Kraków
Polish men's volleyball players
Effector Kielce players
GKS Katowice (volleyball) players
Resovia (volleyball) players
Stal Nysa players
LKPS Lublin players
Setters (volleyball)